Wellington Island is an island west of Southern Patagonian Ice Field, Chile. It has an area of 5,556 km2 and most of the island forms part of Bernardo O'Higgins National Park. It is home to the last Kawésqar people, living in the village of Puerto Edén, the only inhabited place on the island.

See also
 Serrano Island, also named ''Little Wellington Island

References

Islands of Magallanes Region